The MD Helicopters MD Explorer is a light twin-engined utility helicopter designed and initially produced by the American rotorcraft specialist McDonnell Douglas Helicopter Systems.

On 18 December 1992, the maiden flight was conducted, initial certification for the type followed roughly two years later. The initial model, the MD 900, was joined by an improved successor, the MD 902, during the late 1990s. The Explorer is currently produced by MD Helicopters.

Development
In January 1989, McDonnell Douglas Helicopters officially announced the launch of the Explorer, which it initially referred to as the MDX. Amongst other things, the Explorer was the first McDonnell Douglas helicopter to incorporate the NOTAR system from its initial design. McDonnell Douglas partnered with Hawker de Havilland of Australia, which handled the manufacturing of the airframes. A total of ten prototypes were constructed, seven of which being used for ground-based tests. McDonnell Douglas Helicopters became a launch customer for Pratt & Whitney Canada's PW200 turboshaft engines, for which it had an exclusive agreement to power the first 128 Explorers with pairs of PW206As. While plans had been mooted to offer the Turbomeca Arrius powerplant as an alternative option, these were subsequently discarded.

On 18 December 1992, the maiden flight of the Explorer took place, performed by ship #2 (N900MD). On 2 December 1994, Federal Aviation Administration (FAA) certification for the Explorer was granted, permitting its use in North America; Joint Aviation Authorities (JAA) certification was received shortly thereafter. However, certification of the Explorer's instrument flight rules (IFR) capability was protracted due to technical difficulties with integration; in February 1997, FAA certification for IFR operations was finally received.

On 29 May 1997, all Explorers were temporarily grounded following the discovery of a broken drive-link; during the following month, flight operations resumed after the FAA gave its approval of a redesigned component that addressed the issue.

During September 1997, a range of improvements to the Explorer were introduced. These included the availability of the PW206E engine, which had a higher single engine inoperative rating, along with revised engine air inlets, improved NOTAR inlet design, and a more powerful stabiliser control system. The benefits were improvements to both range and endurance, along with an increased maximum takeoff weight. This enhanced Explorer was unofficially designated the MD 902.

In May 1998, it was reported that Bell Helicopters, as part of a wider deal with Boeing, had acquired the rights to support and produce spare components for the Explorer; however, this deal did not include the ability to perform final assembly or otherwise produce complete rotorcraft. Accordingly, it was speculated that the deal could impact the long term future of the Explorer. However, these plans were terminated due to the intervention of the US Federal Trade Commission. Instead, in the following year, Boeing opted to spin off its civilian line of helicopters, including the Explorer, to the newly formed MD Helicopter Holdings Inc. (MDHI).

During November 1999, the JAA recommended that all 27 member nations certify the Explorer series for Category A single pilot IFR operations. In September 2000, the first Explorers had been delivered with the further improved PW207E engine, which provided improved hot and high performance, as well as when flown with only a single engine operational. During the 2000s, the company recovered from its financial woes and invested in the replenishment of its supply chain.

In the 2010s, the manufacturer dedicated considerable attention to renewing the avionics of the type, such as the addition of a glass cockpit. During 2013, it was announced that MDHI had selected Universal Avionics’ InSight display system for the MD 902 Explorer, replacing the original cathode ray tube (CRT) displays; four years later, the company started offering an alternative arrangement with Genesys Aerosystems. In January 2020, the company announced a new partnership with Universal Avionics, effectively switching back to the vendor, under which the latter would provide their fully-digital flight deck avionics for the MD 900/902 Explorer.

In October 2015, the Civil Aviation Authority of New Zealand (CAANZ) granted type acceptance to the MD 900/902 Explorer series, permitting the restriction-free importing of the type into the country. That same year, the European Aviation Safety Agency (EASA) approved an increased maximum gross weight of 6,770 pounds for the MD 900/902 Explorer, increasing its maximum payload capacity by 270 pounds; this increase had been already approved by the FAA in March 2013.

Reportedly, by 2015, almost 50 percent of all MD 900/902 Explorers produced were being operated in Europe in three areas of the market: emergency medical services (EMS), law enforcement and military/para-military organizations. The EMS sector has been a deliberately selected focus area for MDHI; during 2011, the firm forecasted that Middle Eastern operators would require several hundred EMS rotorcraft over the coming years.

During March 2015, MDHI announced that it was in the process of redesigning the MD Explorer with a higher level of in-house content with the intention of making it more affordable and thus boost sales. The redesign/modernisation of the MD902 Explorer was subsequently referred to the MD969.

By August 2022, while the MD Explorer series was still technically in production, some operators were facing difficulties obtaining some crucial components and the supply chain was reportedly drying up. In response, some vendors were acquiring existing airframes and stripping them for their parts.

Design
The MD Helicopters MD Explorer is a twin engined utility helicopter; it is equipped with a fully-articulated five-bladed main rotor system as well as bearingless composite flexbeams and rotor hub. The fuselage is composed of composite materials, such as carbonfibre, that are resistant to corrosion even in hostile marine environments, it also incorporates lightning strike protection measures. The tail features similar construction. It is powered by a pair of Pratt & Whitney Canada-built PW200 turboshaft engines. It can be flown by a single pilot, and carry up to six passengers at a time.

A key feature of the MD Explorer is the NOTAR anti-torque system; instead of a traditional tail rotor, a fan exhaust is directed out of slots in the tail boom, thus using the Coandă effect for yaw control. The benefits of NOTAR have reportedly included reduced pilot workload, greatly minimised external noise levels, and significant improvements in safety, particularly when operating in confined areas and from offshore platforms, along with general performance and controllability enhancements. It is disputed which of the fenestron and NOTAR approaches produces less noises. Boeing retains the design rights to the NOTAR technology despite selling the former McDonnell Douglas civil helicopter line to MD Helicopters in early 1999.

Variants

MD 900 Explorer
Initial Production model, powered by two Pratt & Whitney Canada PW206A (or PW206E or PW207E) turboshaft engines.
MD 901 Explorer
Civil utility transport model, powered by two Turbomeca Arrius turboshaft engines and tri-angel landing gear. McDonnel Douglas Helicopters announced that this type was available from serial number 127 and upwards. By sale of civil helicopter variants to MD Helicopters the type was not further developed. None ordered.
MD 902
Marketing name for an enhanced version with Category A approval and powered by two Pratt & Whitney Canada PW206E or PW207E. Enhanced version has additional engine isolation features and changes to the Integrated Instrument Display System. Older helicopters (except for the first seven built) can be modified to the enhanced version.
MH-90 Enforcer
Armed version for the United States Coast Guard flown by the Helicopter Interdiction Tactical Squadron between 1998 and 2000.
MD 969 Combat Explorer
Armed helicopter version.
Swift
A high-speed compound helicopter derived from the MD 969 that was being developed for the US Army’s Future Attack Reconnaissance Aircraft (FARA) program. Excluded from FARA in 2019.

Operators

 

 
 Federal Police
 
 Landespolizei
 
 Hungarian Police
 
 Heliservices
 
 Luxembourg Air Rescue
 Luxembourg Police
 
 Mexican Navy
 1st Shipborne Patrol Naval Air Squadron, Mexican Naval Aviation
 
 Essex & Herts Air Ambulance 
 London's Air Ambulance
 Wiltshire Police
 
 Calstar
 Drug Enforcement Administration
 National Park Service
 University of Missouri Hospital
 
 Doctor Heli

Former operator
 
 Cornwall Air Ambulance
 
 United States Coast Guard
  Helicopter Interdiction Tactical Squadron 1998-2000

Specifications

See also

References

Citations

Bibliography
 Frawley, Gerard: The International Directory of Civil Aircraft, 2003-2004, Aerospace Publications Pty Ltd, 2003. .
 Jackson, Paul. Jane's All The World's Aircraft 2003–2004. Coulsdon, UK: Jane's Information Group, 2003. .

External links

 MD Helicopters MD Explorer page
 BlueSkyRotor.com- performance datasheet of MD900 Explorer

1960s United States helicopters
1960s United States civil utility aircraft
Explorer
NOTAR helicopters
Twin-turbine helicopters
Aircraft first flown in 1992